Rab11 family-interacting protein 3 is a protein that in humans is encoded by the RAB11FIP3 gene.

Proteins of the large Rab GTPase family (see RAB1A; MIM 179508) have regulatory roles in the formation, targeting, and fusion of intracellular transport vesicles. RAB11FIP3 is one of many proteins that interact with and regulate Rab GTPases (Hales et al., 2001).[supplied by OMIM]

Interactions
RAB11FIP3 has been shown to interact with RAB11A.

References

Further reading

 
 
 
 
 
 
 
 
 
 
 
 
 
 
 

EF-hand-containing proteins